HAT-P-11, also designated GSC 03561-02092, is an orange dwarf metal rich star about 123 light-years away in the constellation Cygnus. This star is notable for its relatively large rate of proper motion. The magnitude of this star is about 9, which means it is not visible to the naked eye but can be seen with a medium-sized amateur telescope on a clear dark night. The age of this star is about 6.5 billion years.

The star has active latitudes that generate starspots. The star appears to have a very small radius, which can be explained by the anomalously high helium fraction.

Planetary system

An extrasolar planet, was discovered by the HATNet Project using the transit method, believed to be a little larger than the planet Neptune.

That planet orbits out of alignment from the star's spin axis. The system is oblique at 100°. This star system was within the field of view of the Kepler Mission planet-hunter spacecraft.

A trend in the radial velocity measurements taken to confirm the planet indicated a possible additional body in the system. This was confirmed in 2018 when a second planet was detected on an approximately nine year orbit. In 2020, the true mass of HAT-P-11c was measured via astrometry, along with Pi Mensae b.

See also
 HATNet Project
 Kepler Mission

References

External links
 

Cygnus (constellation)
K-type main-sequence stars
Planetary transit variables
Planetary systems with two confirmed planets
3
097657
Durchmusterung objects